Nicholas Clive Kurt Evers (1 November 1937 – 27 July 2013) was an Australian politician.

Early life and career
Born in Wynyard, Tasmania, Evers held a Bachelor of Arts (Hons) from the University of Tasmania.

Evers joined the diplomatic service of the Department of External Affairs, and was posted in Ghana and Korea. In the early 1970s, he was a deputy general manager at the Australian Tourism Commission (ATC). Prior to entering politics, he was the head of the Department of Premier and Cabinet in Tasmania.

Political career
In 1986, Evers was head-hunted by the Liberal Premier of Tasmania, Robin Gray, who asked him to run for Parliament at that year's state election. He was one of several high-profile individuals, dubbed the "magnificent seven", who were personally selected by Gray for their expertise and vision, and who he hoped would replace Liberal Party "drones" in the parliament. When Gray won the election, Evers who had won a seat in Franklin, was immediately appointed to his cabinet as Minister for Transport, Primary Industry and Public Administration. In 1988, he was made Minister for Tourism in addition to his other portfolios. On 1 June 1989, Robin Gray formed a ministry in which Evers was Minister for Industrial Relations, and Labour and Industry, however Gray's minority government was dissolved by the Governor of Tasmania, who then commissioned Michael Field as Premier with the support of five Green Independents under the Labor–Green Accord.

Evers resigned from parliament on 23 July 1990, citing a "lack of privacy and low pay".

After politics
After leaving state politics, Evers was the chairman of the TT-Line Company, which operated the Bass Strait ferry service between Tasmania and the mainland. In 1999, he was appointed chairman of the Australian Tourism Commission. He resigned in 2004 when the ATC was merged into Tourism Australia.

Illness and death
Evers died following a long illness on 27 July 2013, aged 75, at a nursing home in Launceston. He was survived by his wife and two children.

References

1937 births
2013 deaths
Liberal Party of Australia members of the Parliament of Tasmania
Members of the Tasmanian House of Assembly
High Commissioners of Australia to Ghana
Australian diplomats
Australian public servants
People from Wynyard, Tasmania
University of Tasmania alumni